The Turkish Workers' Union in the Netherlands ( (HTIB)) is a left-wing organization founded in 1974 by a group Turkish workers. Its first purpose was to commit Turkish workers in the Netherlands to the struggle for an independent and democratic Turkey, and to organize Turkish workers and help them in the struggle for their rights. The HTIB publishes the magazine Gerçek (Truth).

Among its executive members until 2010 was the Groenlinks deputy Tofik Dibi, although born in a Moroccan family. Its present chairperson since 2001 is Mustafa Ayranci, who was among its founding members in 1974.

Notes and references

See also
Turks in the Netherlands

Political advocacy groups in the Netherlands
Trade unions established in 1974
1974 establishments in the Netherlands
Overseas Turkish organizations